Yassin Oukili (born 3 January 2001) is a Dutch professional footballer who plays as a forward for RKC Waalwijk.

Career

Vitesse
On 5 September 2019, Oukili signed his first professional contract with Vitesse, after having joined the club from Alphense Boys as a youth player. He made his professional debut with Vitesse in a 3–0 Eredivisie win over FC Twente on 14 December 2019.

RKC Waalwijk
During the winter break in January 2021, Oukili signed a two-and-a-half-year contract with RKC Waalwijk, with an option for an additional season. Upon signing him, director of sports Frank van Mosselveld praised Oukili as a versatile midfielder, and said that he was a part of the club's "mission of signing talented players". 

On 21 August 2021, the second matchday of the 2021–22 season, Oukili made his debut for RKC in the 3–2 away loss against SC Heerenveen. He came on as a substitute for Ayman Azhil in the 84th minute.

References

External links
 
 OnsOranje U16 Profile

2001 births
Living people
Sportspeople from Amersfoort
Dutch footballers
Association football forwards
Dutch sportspeople of Moroccan descent
SBV Vitesse players
RKC Waalwijk players
Eredivisie players
Tweede Divisie players
Alphense Boys players
Footballers from Utrecht (province)